Telmatochromis temporalis is a species of cichlid endemic to Lake Tanganyika where they areas with rocky substrates usually at depths of from  though occasionally down to .  This species can reach a length of  TL.  It can also be found in the aquarium trade.

References

External links 
 Photograph

temporalis
Fish described in 1898
Fish of Lake Tanganyika
Taxonomy articles created by Polbot